Harry Bingham Brown (October 9, 1883 – 1954), was a pioneer aviator.

Biography
He was born on October 9, 1883. He set an American height record for carrying a passenger in 1912.

References

External links

Harry Bingham Brown at Early Aviators

Members of the Early Birds of Aviation
1883 births
1954 deaths
American aviation record holders